Leon Gardikiotis (born 27 February 1964) is a Greek-Australian soccer coach and retired player. He was head coach of the Tahiti national team at the 2000 OFC Nations Cup. He was head coach of Springvale White Eagles for a brief period in 2007.

Playing career
Gardikiotis was born in Germany by Greek parents, who used to live in Egaleo, and moved to Australia. He signed his first professional contract with Greek club Larissa in 1985 and also played for Doxa Drama. He also went to play in Australia for St. George, Sydney Olympic, Canberra, Marrickville Olympic, Heidelberg and Wollongong Wolves.

Coaching career
Leon Gardikiotis, started his coaching career as Head Coach at the age of 31 for a second tier club in Australia called West Wanderers in 1995. Following his introduction to senior team football management, that same season 1995/96 he was offered and worked as the assistant 1st team coach to Berti Mariani at Wollongong Wolves in the Australian National League.
The experience and knowledge he picked up coaching in the highest league in Australia, assisted in his ability to handle his next assignment as an associate staff coach at the Brazilian Football Academy (BFA) in Rio de Janeiro, where he also received his senior coaching Diploma.
Following the knowledge he acquired from Brazil he then became the Technical Director of the Football Academy of Excellence in Sydney (FAE) and was the official representatives of the BFA in the Oceania region. The FAE was recognised by FIFA and Football Australia.
In 1998/99 he coached the Fijian National U17's and U20s teams. With the U17's he participated in the Oceania World Cup qualifiers and finished 2nd to Australia who finished 2nd in the World Cup.
The success he achieved with the National Youth teams sparked the interest of the French and in November 1999 became the National Coach of the Senior Team of Tahiti. As National coach he participated in the Oceania Nations Cup. Under Gardikiotis Tahiti reached 117th in the FIFA World Rankings.

In the 2000/01 Australian National Soccer League season, Gardikiotis became Head Coach of Canberra Cosmos and then it was followed by coaching Whittlesea Stallions in season 2003/04.

On 7 September 2005, it was announced that Gardikiotis would become the assistant coach of Greek Beta Ethniki side Panachaiki, under head coach Ken Warden. When Warden was released six days later, Gardikiotis became the head coach.

In 2007, Gardikiotis was head coach of Victorian Premier League side Springvale White Eagles, however he resigned after less than a month in charge, with the club at the bottom of the league.
In 2008, he was the head coach of Niki Volou in Greece, but resigned and joined Lamia on 10 February 2009.

In the last couple of years Gardikiotis has worked once again for the Brazilian Football Academy in various projects.

References

External links
 
 Leon Gardikiotis Football Profile

1964 births
Australian people of Greek descent
Australian soccer coaches
Australian expatriate soccer coaches
Greek footballers
Greek expatriate football managers
Athlitiki Enosi Larissa F.C. players
Niki Volos F.C. players
Doxa Drama F.C. players
Panachaiki F.C. managers
Sydney Olympic FC players
Expatriate football managers in French Polynesia
Tahiti national football team managers
Living people
Association football forwards
Australian soccer players